André Bishop (born November 9, 1948) is an American theatrical producer, and Artistic Director and Producing Artistic Director, of Lincoln Center Theater.  He has produced over 80 Broadway plays and musicals and has won numerous Tony Awards.

Early life
Bishop was born André Bishop Smolianinoff, and changed his name to Andre S. Bishop after the death of this father.  He graduated from Harvard University in 1970 where he was a pupil of dramatist Robert Chapman.
He was the Artistic Director of Playwrights Horizons from 1981 to 1991.
He is a member of the American Academy of Arts and Sciences and an inductee in the American Theater Hall of Fame.

Awards

Tony Awards
1994 Best Revival of a Musical: Carousel - Producer
1995  Best Revival of a Play:  The Heiress - Producer
1996  Best Revival of Play: A Delicate Balance - Producer
2000  Best Musical:  Contact - Producer
2004  Best Revival of a Play: Henry IV - Producer
2006  Best Revival of a Play: Awake and Sing! - Producer
2007  Best Play: The Coast of Utopia - Producer
2008 Best Revival of a Musical: Rodgers & Hammerstein's South Pacific - Producer
2011  Best Play:  War Horse- Producer
2015 Best Revival of a Musical: The King and I - Producer
2017 Best Play:  Oslo'' - Producer

American Theater Hall of Fame
 Inducted in 2012

References

External links

1948 births
Living people
American theatre managers and producers
Harvard University alumni
Tony Award winners
Lincoln Center